Miles James Burris (born June 27, 1988) is an actor and former American football linebacker who played for the Oakland Raiders from 2012 to 2014. He played college football at San Diego State and was selected in the fourth round of the 2012 NFL Draft by the Oakland Raiders. In his rookie season, Burris immediately became a regular part of the Raiders' defense, starting all but one game that season. He has also worked as an actor, appearing in the Disney+ film Safety as well as HBO’s The Righteous Gemstones and the Netflix series Lucifer.

Early life and college career
Born in Orangevale, California, Burris graduated from Granite Bay High School of Granite Bay, California in 2007. At Granite Bay, he was twice named All-Metro League and was Granite Bay’s defensive player of the year following both his junior and senior seasons.

Burris was a two-time All-Mountain West Conference first-team selection at San Diego State and led the Aztecs in tackles as a senior, posting 78 stops, including 46 solo tackles, and 19.5 tackles for loss. Burris added eight sacks and three fumble recoveries that same season. He had 9.5 sacks as a junior, which ranked as the seventh-highest single-season total in program history. He also led the team with 80 tackles and was named the 2010 San Diego State Student-Athlete of the Year.

Professional career

Based on his NFL Scouting Combine and Pro Day results, NFL Draft Scout projected Burris to be a fifth-round NFL Draft selection. In the 2012 NFL Draft, the Oakland Raiders selected Burris in the fourth round as the 129th overall pick. As a rookie, Burris played all 16 games and started 15 and had 62 unassisted tackles, 34 assisted, 1.5 sacks, 3 passes deflected, and one interception. On December 23, Burris intercepted Carolina Panthers quarterback Cam Newton and returned the pick for 7 yards after Philip Wheeler deflected the pass. This interception ended Newton's streak of 176 passes without an interception. Burris was released from the Raiders following the 2015 NFL Draft.

Acting career
Following numerous injuries, Burris retired from football in 2017 and decided to step into the field of acting, having taken an acting course while attending San Diego State. In 2020, he played a football player named Keller in the Disney+ exclusive film Safety. He also stars as Titus in HBO’s The Righteous Gemstones (Seasons 2) and Jophiel in the Netflix series Lucifer.

Filmography

Television

References

External links
 Oakland Raiders bio
 San Diego State Aztecs bio
 

1988 births
Living people
American football linebackers
San Diego State Aztecs football players
Oakland Raiders players
Sportspeople from Sacramento County, California
People from Granite Bay, California
Players of American football from California